The UK Singles Downloads Chart is a weekly music chart that ranks the most-downloaded singles in the United Kingdom. During the 2000s, the chart was compiled by The Official UK Charts Company (OCC) on behalf of the British music industry, and was based solely on non-subscription music downloads from selected online music stores. It was compiled using weekly sales from Sunday to Saturday, and was published each Wednesday afternoon, so as not to clash with the Sunday evening announcement of the UK Singles Chart.

The chart was founded in September 2004 as the UK Official Download Chart, with the first single to top the chart being a live version of "Flying Without Wings" by Irish boy band Westlife. By the end of the decade, 109 further singles had topped the chart. The most downloaded single of the 2000s was "Poker Face" by Lady Gaga. Released in 2009, the song was downloaded 779,000 times, and topped the chart for three weeks. "Just Dance", also by Gaga, and "Sex on Fire" by Kings of Leon were the third and second highest selling downloads of the decade respectively. The single that spent the longest time at number one was "Crazy" by Gnarls Barkley, which spent 11 weeks at the top and became the UK's 18th best-selling download of the 2000s.

The most successful artist of the decade was Barbadian singer Rihanna, who featured on five different number-one singles for a total of 13 weeks. The most successful record label was Universal Music Group; with an artist roster that included Rihanna, The Black Eyed Peas and U2, Universal spent 110 weeks at number one with 40 different singles. The final number one of the 2000s was "Killing in the Name", a 1993 single by American rap metal band Rage Against the Machine, which was pushed to the top of the chart as a result of an online campaign to prevent Joe McElderry, the 2009 winner of the X Factor, from reaching number one. "Killing in the Name" sold over 500,000 copies in one week, making it the UK's fastest-selling digital download of all time.

Chart history

Before the inauguration of the download chart, only sales of physical formats—such as CD, vinyl and cassette tape—contributed towards a single's position on the UK music charts. From the late 1990s onwards, these sales began to significantly decline. By the start of 2004, they had dropped to their lowest level in over 35 years, with singles needing to sell only 35,000 copies to reach number one. One year later, a limited edition re-release of "One Night" / "I Got Stung" by Elvis Presley topped the chart with 22,000 copies, making it the lowest selling number-one single at that time. Conversely, the music download market was growing considerably: during the same 2004–05 period, sales of downloads grew by 743%, and overtook physical sales in December 2004. The following year, the UK's online music revenue reached .

As a result of this growth, the OCC were commissioned in 2004 to compile a new music chart based solely on the UK's download sales, which was initially sponsored by Coca-Cola. A "sample" download chart was trialled for 10 weeks, with the first number one being "Bam Thwok" by American rock band Pixies. After this ten-week period, the UK Official Download Chart was launched on 1 September 2004, with Westlife achieving the first official number one. The group topped the chart with a live version of their 1999 single "Flying Without Wings", a move that UK chart commentator James Masterton branded a "stunt".

By 2007 the UK had become Europe's largest consumer of online music, with almost 78 million tracks being downloaded that year – by the end of the decade this figure had nearly doubled. Sales of downloaded singles were finally incorporated into the UK Singles Chart in April 2005 – , the UK Official Download Chart continues to be published each week by the OCC, under the name the UK Singles Downloads Chart.

Number ones

By artist

Fifteen different artists spent seven or more weeks at the top of the UK Official Download Chart during the 2000s. The totals below include only credited performances, and do not include appearances on charity ensembles such as Band Aid 20 or The X Factor Finalists.

By record label
Nine different record labels released chart-topping singles during the 2000s.

Download sites
During the 2000s, the UK Official Download Chart was compiled by the OCC using data from the following music download websites:

7digital
Big Noise Music
Bleep
City 16
easyMusic
HMV
iTunes
KarmaDownload
Metacharge
MSN Music
The Music Engine Service
MyCokeMusic
Napster
OD2
Playlouder
Recordstore
Sonic Selector
Tesco
Tiscali Music
Virgin
Wanadoo
Wippit
Woolworths

Notes

References

External links
The Official Download Chart at MTV UK
Singles Download Chart at the Official Charts Company

2000s in British music
United Kingdom Download Singles
Download 2000s